Aghaviller  is the site of a church and round tower in County Kilkenny, Ireland. It is a protected National Monument.

Aghaviller gives its name to the wider townland, civil parish, and electoral district.

Located south-east of Kilkenny, about six miles south of Thomastown near Knocktopher.

Etymology
The Annals of the Four Masters call it Achadh-biorair (Ahabirrer),  meaning the field of watercresses. Tighe refers to Agha-oillir, meaning field of the pilgrim.

Church and tower

A few yards distant from the site of the old church, is the remains of the lower part of an ancient round tower composed of breccia.

The Statistical Survey of 1802, makes reference to the tower, as does the 1855 Kilkenny Archaeological Society.

It is one of five round towers located around the county, the others are at Kilkenny, Tullaherin, Kilree and Grangefertagh. The tower is different from many round towers as it has two doors. Nearby is a holy well and Castlemorres Demesne.

Civil parish
In 1851 the Civil parish of Aghaviller contained the townlands of Aghaviller, Ballinteskin, Ballinva, Barnadown, Bartonsfarm, Boolyglass, Brownstown, Carrickmerlin, Castlemorris, Catstown, Coalpitparks, Condonstown, Croan, Hugginstown, Kingsmountain or Mylerstown, Kyleva, Mabbotstown, Mylerstown or Kingsmountain, Newmarket and Westmoreland.

Roman Catholic parish
Part of civil parish of Aghaviller is in the Roman Catholic Parish of Aghaviller (Earliest Record: b. Oct 1847; m. Feb 1848. ), and part is in the[Roman Catholic Ballyhale Parish (Earliest Record: b. Aug 1823;  m. 1876 ). It was included within the union of Knocktopher, or Ballyhale.  Ballyhale was part of Aghaviller Catholic parish prior to September 1847.

See also
 List of National Monuments in County Kilkenny
 List of National Monuments in Ireland

Footnotes

References

Notes

Further reading

External links

 

Churches in County Kilkenny
National Monuments in County Kilkenny
Civil parishes of County Kilkenny
Townlands of County Kilkenny